St George's Church, Ticknall is a Grade II listed parish church in the Church of England in Ticknall, Derbyshire.

History

The church was built in 1842 by the architect Henry Isaac Stevens to replace the old church dedicated to St Thomas Becket. It was consecrated by the Bishop of Hereford Rt Revd Thomas Musgrave on 6 October 1842.

Parish status

The church is in a joint parish with:
St Michael with St Mary's Church, Melbourne
St James' Church, Smisby
St Michael's Church, Stanton by Bridge

Organ

The church contains a pipe organ by J.W. Walker dating from 1869. A specification of the organ can be found on the National Pipe Organ Register.

See also
Listed buildings in Ticknall

References

Church of England church buildings in Derbyshire
Grade II listed churches in Derbyshire
Churches completed in 1842